Poleatikon was a coastal town of ancient Bithynia located on the road from Libyssa to Chalcedon on the north coast of the Propontis.

Its site is located near Bostancı in Asiatic Turkey.

References

Populated places in Bithynia
Former populated places in Turkey
History of Istanbul Province